Gaz is a village in Batken Region of Kyrgyzstan. It is part of the Batken District. Its population was 2,201 in 2021.

Nearby towns and villages include Kan, Tayan and Subash.

References

External links 
 Satellite map at Maplandia.com

Populated places in Batken Region